Ralph Emerson Twitchell (1859–1925) was an American attorney, historian, and politician who served as the mayor of Santa Fe, New Mexico and chairman of the Rio Grande Commission, which drafted a treaty between the United States and Mexico leading to the building of the Elephant Butte Dam. Twitchell helped organize the first National Irrigation Congress in 1891. He is credited with rescuing the Spanish Archives from the territorial capitol building when it caught fire on May 12, 1892, and also designing the first Flag of New Mexico in 1915.

Early life and education 
Ralph Emerson Twitchell was born in Ann Arbor, Michigan, to David Sawin and Delia Scott Twitchell. He received his Bachelor's degree from the University of Kansas and his L.L.B. from the University of Michigan Law School.

Career 
He first moved to New Mexico Territory in 1882, settling in Las Vegas, New Mexico to work in the law office of Henry L. Waldo. In 1897, Governor Miguel Otero appointed him judge advocate of the New Mexico militia and granted him the title of colonel. For the remainder of his life, Twitchell was always addressed respectfully as "colonel."

From 1889 to 1892 he was District Attorney for the First Judicial District.  For forty-three years Twitchell worked in the legal department of the Santa Fe Railroad. In 1921, he was appointed special counsel for the United States Attorney General,  specializing in Native American and water rights cases.

Twitchell was involved with numerous organizations in Santa Fe. He sat on the Board of Regents of the Museum of New Mexico. He founded and edited a historical quarterly called Old Santa Fe:  A Magazine of History, Archaeology, Genealogy and Biography, which covered the activities of the Museum of New Mexico, Historical Society of New Mexico, and the Santa Fe branch of the School of American Archaeology. As President of the Santa Fe Chamber of Commerce from 1920-1922 he helped revive the Santa Fe Fiesta.

Personal life 
In 1885, he married Margaret Olivia Collins. He died August 25, 1925, at the age of 68 in Los Angeles, California.

Bibliography
 
 
 Old Santa Fe

References

External links
Twitchell, Ralph Emerson.

1859 births
1925 deaths
Mayors of Santa Fe, New Mexico
New Mexico lawyers
American historians
New Mexico Republicans
Atchison, Topeka and Santa Fe Railway people
People from Las Vegas, New Mexico
University of Kansas alumni
University of Michigan Law School alumni
19th-century American lawyers